Robert Bednar (born July 11, 1911, died July 24, 1993) was an Austrian bobsledder who competed in the mid-1930s. He finished 13th and last in completing the four runs in the four-man event at the 1936 Winter Olympics in Garmisch-Partenkirchen.

References
1936 bobsleigh four-man results
1936 Olympic Winter Games official report. - p. 415.
Robert Bednar's profile at Sports Reference.com

1911 births
Austrian male bobsledders
Bobsledders at the 1936 Winter Olympics
Year of death missing
Olympic bobsledders of Austria